E3 ubiquitin-protein ligase NRDP1 is an enzyme that in humans is encoded by the RNF41 gene.

Function 

The protein encoded by this gene contains a RING finger, a motif present in a variety of functionally distinct proteins and known to be involved in protein-protein and protein-DNA interactions. The specific function of this protein has not yet been determined. Three alternatively spliced transcript variants encoding two distinct isoforms have been reported.

Interactions 

RNF41 has been shown to interact with USP8.

See also 
 RING finger domain

References

Further reading

External links 
 
 
 

RING finger proteins